Florina is a city in Greece.

Florina may also refer to:

 Florina (regional unit), an administrative unit in Greece
 Florina (name), a female Romanian given name
 Florina (planet), a planet in Isaac Asimov's Foundation universe
 Florina (apple), an apple cultivar
 Florina, a character from the video game Fire Emblem: The Blazing Blade on Game Boy Advance

See also 
 Florinas, a city in Sardinia, Italy

sv:Florina